Miss International Australia is a national beauty pageant that selects Australia's representative to the Miss International Pageant.

History

The Miss International Australia Quest is an Australian competition for young aspiring models, held for the first time in 2004. The National Director is Karen Jane Sabarre CEO of Karen Jane Productions. The winner of Miss International Australia attends the Miss International world final held in Japan and represents Australia alongside 80 other countries.

Miss Australia who won Miss International competition
Miss International 1972: Kirsten Davidson
Miss International 1981: Jenny Derek
Miss International 1961: Tanie Verstak

Titleholders
Color keys

Australian representatives at Miss International pageant before 2004
Color keys

See also 

 Miss Australia
 Miss Universe Australia
 Miss World Australia
 Miss Earth Australia

External links
Official website

References

Australia
Australian awards
Beauty pageants in Australia